In English law, a civil prisoner is a person who has been imprisoned for an offence that is not a crime.

According to the Prison Reform Trust website, persons who do not pay child support or other legally due money may be civilly imprisoned.

References

English law
Penal system in England